Chelsea Mae Hodges  (born 27 June 2001) is an Australian swimmer. She competed in the women's 100 metre breaststroke at the 2020 Summer Olympics.

Career
At the 2020 Summer Olympics at Tokyo Hodges was a semi-finalist in the Women's 100 metre breaststroke swimming the ninth fastest time (1:06.60) and just missing the final by 0.01 second.

Hodges later swam the breaststroke leg of the Women's 4 × 100 metre medley relay 
for the gold medal winning Australian team. Hodges was up against American 100m breaststroke gold medalist Lydia Jacoby and despite being 
1.65 seconds slower than Jacoby in the individual event Hodges posted a time of 1:05.57 in the final of the relay which was only 0.54 seconds slower than the American. Hodges' breaststroke leg kept the Australians within striking distance of the Americans and with Emma McKeon narrowing the gap Cate Campbell was able to touch the wall first ahead of American Abbey Weitzeil to win the gold medal for Australia.

In the 2022 Australia Day Honours Hodges was awarded the Medal of the Order of Australia.

World records

Short course metres

 split 29.11 (breaststroke leg); with Mollie O'Callaghan (backstroke leg), Emma McKeon (butterfly leg), Madison Wilson (freestyle leg)

Olympic records

Long course metres

 split 1:05.57 for breaststroke leg; with Kaylee McKeown (backstroke leg), Emma McKeon (butterfly), Cate Campbell (freestyle)

References

External links
 

2001 births
Living people
Australian female breaststroke swimmers
Recipients of the Medal of the Order of Australia
Sportswomen from Queensland
Swimmers at the 2018 Summer Youth Olympics
Olympic swimmers of Australia
Swimmers at the 2020 Summer Olympics
Medalists at the 2020 Summer Olympics
Olympic gold medalists for Australia
Olympic gold medalists in swimming
Medalists at the 2019 Summer Universiade
Universiade medalists in swimming
Swimmers at the 2022 Commonwealth Games
Commonwealth Games medallists in swimming
Commonwealth Games gold medallists for Australia
Commonwealth Games bronze medallists for Australia
Medalists at the FINA World Swimming Championships (25 m)
21st-century Australian women
Universiade bronze medalists for Australia
Medallists at the 2022 Commonwealth Games